Ephestia unicolorella is a species of snout moth in the genus Ephestia. It was described by Staudinger in 1881, and is known from Iran, Turkey, Morocco, Azerbaijan and most of Europe.

The wingspan is 10–13 mm.

The larvae feed on dried plant matter.

Subspecies
Ephestia unicolorella unicolorella
Ephestia unicolorella woodiella Richards & Thomson, 1932 (Europe)

References

Moths described in 1881
Phycitini
Moths of Europe